"Fairytale Gone Bad" is a song by rock quintet Sunrise Avenue. It charted successfully in many European countries, especially their native Finland as well as Germany, Greece and a number of other Northern and Eastern European countries.

Music video 
The music video for "Fairytale Gone Bad" was filmed on 2006 in Barcelona, Spain and was directed by Ralf Strathmann.

Track listing

CD single
 "Fairytale Gone Bad (radio edit)" – 3:33
 "Fairytale Gone Bad (album version)" – 3:25
 "Fairytale Gone Bad (acoustic version)" – 3:44
 "Fairytale Gone Bad (instrumental version)" – 3:32
 "Into The Blue" – 5:28

Charts

Weekly charts

Year-end charts

Certifications

External links

References

2006 singles
2006 songs
Sunrise Avenue songs